Vuksan is a Slavic masculine given name, derived from Slavic noun vuk, "wolf". It is a hypocoristic, possibly of the name Vukoslav. It is attested in the Middle Ages, and Serbian epic poetry. It is also used as a surname. The patronymic surname Vuksanović is derived from the name. It may refer to:

As given name:
Vuksan Bilanović, Serbian pop lyrics writer (Kraj i tačka)
Vuksan ( 1477), Rovca knez and epic character (Vuksan od Rovaca)
Vuksan (fl. 1616/17), donator to the Morača monastery
Vuksan Gela (or Gelja), legendary founder of the northern Albanian Gruda tribe

As surname:
Dušan Vuksan (1881–1944), Yugoslav historian and educator
Dušan Vuksan, Serbian industrial designer and educator
Radoje M. Vuksan (fl. 1898), Austro-Hungarian Serb educator and writer



See also
Serbian names

Annotations

References

Sources

Serbian masculine given names
Serbian surnames
Croatian surnames